Enzo Rafael Guzmán Espinal (born 2 August 2002) is a Dominican professional footballer who plays as a goalkeeper for Cibao.

Career statistics

Club

Notes

References

2002 births
Living people
Dominican Republic footballers
Association football midfielders
Cibao FC players